Let Yourself Go may refer to:

Albums 
Let Yourself Go (Kristin Chenoweth album), 2001
Let Yourself Go, a 1987 album by Sybil Lynch
Let Yourself Go: Live at Jordan Hall, a 1999 album by Fred Hersch
Let Yourself Go: Celebrating Fred Astaire, a 2000 album by Stacey Kent
Let Yourself Go: The '70s Albums, Vol 2 – 1974–1977: The Final Sessions, compilation album by the Supremes

Songs 
 "Let Yourself Go" (808 State song), 1988
 "Let Yourself Go" (Green Day song), 2012
 "Let Yourself Go" (Irving Berlin song), 1936
 "Let Yourself Go" (James Brown song), 1967
 "Let Yourself Go" (Elvis Presley song), 1968
 "Let Yourself Go" (The Supremes song), 1977
 "Let Yourself Go", a 1987 song by Sybil Lynch from her album of the same name
 "Let Yourself Go", a 1978 song by T-Connection from the album On Fire
 "Let Yourself Go", a 2005 song by Smujji from the album True Colours